Helmick is a surname. Notable people with the surname include:

Debra May Helmick, girl murdered by Larry Gene Bell
Frank Helmick (born 1953), Lieutenant General in the United States Army
Paul Helmick, American film director who directed Thunder in Carolina
Robert Helmick (1937–2003), American sports executive
Walt Helmick (born 1944), member of the West Virginia Senate
William Helmick (1817–1888), U.S. Representative from Ohio

See also
James Helmick Beatty (1836–1927), judge from Idaho
Sarah Helmick State Recreation Site, a state park in Polk County, Oregon
Helmick, Ohio, an unincorporated community
Helmick (Steamer), a steamer seized at Cairo, Illinois on April 27, 1861 while loaded with powder and war munitions destined for the Confederacy.